Andrew-John Bethke FBS is a South African composer, conductor and organist.

Biography
Bethke did his first degree at the University of Cape Town, he followed that up with a master's degree in sacred music from the American Southern Methodist University.  He later completed a doctoral degree at his alma mater, UCT.  Bethke was a trainee conductor at the Cape Philharmonic Orchestra.

Bethke was the director of music and precentor at the St. Michael and St. George Cathedral in Grahamstown as well as being the conductor of the Rhodes University Chamber Choir.  He was previously a lecturer at the College of the Transfiguration.

He currently works at the School of Arts, University of KwaZulu-Natal. Bethke does research in Performing Arts, Musicology and History of Religion.

Publications

Compositions
His compositions include:
  In tender contemplation, premiered at the London Festival of Contemporary Church Music on 10 May 2015.
  Sing, O heavens, an entrant in the  King James Bible Composition Competition.

Awards
Bethke was a recipient of the Cape Organ Guild Barrow-Dowling Scholarship in 2004.

References

External links

Living people
South African organists
Male organists
South African conductors (music)
21st-century conductors (music)
21st-century organists
21st-century male musicians
Year of birth missing (living people)